Stewart Paul Heaney (born 17 October 1980) is a Canadian cricketer who played in three One Day Internationals/

He has also played cricket for the Australian Capital Territory.

External links 

1980 births
Canadian emigrants to Australia
Australian cricketers
Cricketers from British Columbia
Canadian cricketers
Canada One Day International cricketers
Living people
Sportspeople from Prince George, British Columbia